Kalpathi Ganpathi "K.G." Subramanyan (1924  29 June 2016) was an Indian artist. He was awarded the Padma Vibhushan in 2012.

Life

Subramanyan was born in Tamil Brahmin family on 1924 in Kuthuparamba in Kerala, India, and initially studied economics at Presidency College, Madras. During the freedom struggle he was actively involved and was known for his Gandhian ideology. He was even imprisoned and later banned from joining government colleges during the British Rule. The turning point of his life, as an artist, came when he visited Santiniketan to study in Kala Bhavan, the art faculty of Visva Bharati University, in the year 1944. Under the tutelage of such pioneers of modern Indian art as Nandalal Bose, Benode Behari Mukherjee and Ramkinkar Baij, Subramanyan studied there till 1948.

In 1951 he became a lecturer at the Faculty of Fine Arts in M.S. University in Baroda. He went to study briefly in London at the Slade School of Art as a British Council scholar in 1956. While having already gone back to Baroda as a professor in painting and continuing there, he did a short stint in New York as a Rockefeller Fellow in 1966. In 1980, Subramanyan went back to Santiniketan to teach in his alma mater Kala Bhavan, Visva Bharati University, in his capacity as a professor in painting, which he continued till he retired in 1989. In the same year, he was made a Professor Emeritus of Visva Bharati.

Subramanyan resided in Baroda, with his daughter Uma, towards the later days of his life and it was here that he died on 29 June 2016.

Artistic styles and Influences 
K.G. Subramanyan was greatly influenced by folk art from Kerala, Kalighat painting and Pattachitra from Bengal and Odisha, as well as Indian court paintings.

Retrospective show

There have been numerous retrospective shows of K.G. Subramanyan.
K.G. Subramanyan, a Retrospective was the fourth and largest, curated by R. Siva Kumar at the National Gallery of Modern Art.

Career

From 1951 to 59 Mr. Subramanyan was the Lecturer in Painting, Faculty of Fine Arts, Baroda. He was the British Council Research Scholar, UK from 1955–56. He was Deputy Director (design), All India Handloom Board, Bombay from 1959 to 61 and Reader in Painting, Faculty of Fine Arts, Baroda from 1961 to 65.

 1966–80 Professor of Painting, Faculty of Fine Arts, Baroda
 1961–66 Design Consultant, All India
 1966–67 Fellowship of The JDR III Fund, New York
 1968–74 Dean, Faculty of Fine Arts, Baroda
 1975 Elected to the World Crafts Council
 Delegate, Asian Assembly, World Craft Council, Sydney
 1976 Member delegate, General Assembly, World Craft Council, Oaxtepec, Mexico
 Visiting lecturer, Canadian universities: Montreal, Ottawa, Hamilton
 1977–78 Visiting Fellow, Kala Bhavan, Visva Bharati, Santiniketan
 1980–89 Professor of Painting, Kala Bhavan, Visva Bharati, Santiniketan
 1985 Guest, Chinese Artists Association, China
 1987–88 Christensen Fellow, St. Catherine’s College, Oxford
 1989 Professor Emeritus, Kala Bhavan, Visva Bharati, Santiniketan
 2004 Left Santiniketan and shifted back to Baroda in September.

Honours and awards

 1963: Medallion of Honourable Mention, Sao Paulo Biennale, Brazil
 1965: National Award, Lalit Kala Akademi
 1968: Gold Medal, The First International Triennale, New Delhi
 1975: Padma Shri, Government of India
 1991: Gagan-Aban Puraskar, Visva-Bharati University, Santiniketan
 1992: D.Litt. (Honoris Causa), Rabindra Bharati University, Calcutta
 2006: Awarded Padma Bhushan by the Government of India
 2009: Awarded Dishikottam, Visva-Bharati University, Santiniketan
 2011: Awarded D.Litt. (Honoris Causa), Assam University, Silchar.
 2012: Awarded the Padma Vibhushan by the Government of India
 2015: Awarded the Dhirubhai Thakar Savyasachi Saraswat Award

Memberships and associations

 1961–67 All India Board of Technical Studies in Applied Art
 1961–65 Gujarat Lalit Kala Akademi
 1967–79 Lalit Kala Akademi
 1968–74 Gujarat Lalit Kala Akademi
 1974–78 Member of the Governing Council, National Institute of Design, Ahmedabad
 1981–84 Member Siksha-samiti and Karma-samiti of Visva Bharati, Santiniketan
 1981–84 Member of the All India Handloom and Handicrafts Board
 
He has also been on the Board of studies of M.S. University, Baroda; Benaras Hindu University, Benaras; Punjab University, Chandigarh; College of Fine Arts, Trivadrum, Kerala; Faculty of Fine Arts, Bombay University; Rabindra Bharati University, Calcutta etc. and a
member of the Editorial advisory Board of Leonardo.

Books

 1978 Moving Focus: Essays on Indian Art, Lalit Kala Akademi, New Delhi. (Reissued by Seagull Books, Calcutta in 2006)
 1987 The Living Tradition, Seagull Books, Calcutta
 1992 The Creative Circuit, Seagull Books, Calcutta
 2006	Translation of Benodebehari Mukherjee’s Chitrakar, Seagull Books, Calcutta
 2007	Poems, Seagull Books, Calcutta
 2007	The Magic of Making: Essays on Art and Culture, Seagull Books, Calcutta

Illustrated books

 1969 When God First Made the Animals He Made Them All Alike
 1972 The Butterfly and the Cricket, A Summer Story, Robby
 1974 Our Friends the Ogres, The King and the Little Man
 1979 How Poppy Grew happy, Cat’s Night and Day, Frog Life is Fun Life
 1985 Of Ogres Beasts and Men (When God First Made the Animals He Made Them All Alike, Our Friends the Ogres, and The King and the Little Man reissued as a boxed set)
 1995 How Hanu Became Hanuman, Death in Eden, In the Zoo (All three reissued in 1996)
 1998 The Tale of the Talking Face

Murals

 1955 Jyoti Ltd., Baroda Faculty of Fine Arts, Baroda
 1963   ‘King of the Dark Chamber’, Rabindralaya, Lucknow
 1965 India Pavilion, New York World Fair, New York
 1969   ‘India of my Dreams Pavilion’, Gandhi Darshan, New Delhi
 1976 R & D Building, Jyoti Pvt. Ltd., Baroda
 1988 Sand cast Cement Mural, Kala Bhavan, Santiniketan
 1989 Reverse painting on Glass Mural (with school children), Santiniketan
 1990 Black and White Mural, Kala Bhavana, Santiniketan (first phase)
 1993 Black and White Mural, Kala Bhavana, Santiniketan (second phase)
 2009 Black and White Mural, Kala Bhavana, Santiniketan (2nd version)

Students
Some of his students were Bhupen Khakhar, Ghulam Rasool Santosh, Gulam Mohammed Sheikh, Haku Shah, Jayant Parikh, Jyoti Bhatt, Jyotsna Bhatt, Laxma Goud, Mrinalini Mukherjee, Nilima Sheikh, Rajeev Lochan, Ratan Parimoo, Rekha Rodwittiya, Shanti Dave, Thota Vaikuntam, Vivan Sundaram.

See also

References

External links

 K G Subramanyan Paintings
"K G Subramanyan Profile,Interview and Artworks"
 20th Century Museum of Contemporary Indian Art
 Subramanyan on "Artnet"
 Centre for International Modern Art
 K. G. Subramanyan video at Web of Stories
 Children's books by K G Subramanyan
K. G. Subramanyan : Artist Profile and Artworks on 'Artisera'

20th-century Indian painters
Indian children's book illustrators
Presidency College, Chennai alumni
Emeritus Professors in India
Recipients of the Padma Bhushan in arts
Recipients of the Padma Shri in arts
1924 births
2016 deaths
Rockefeller Foundation people
Fellows of the Lalit Kala Akademi
Academic staff of Visva-Bharati University
Academic staff of Maharaja Sayajirao University of Baroda
Recipients of the Padma Vibhushan in arts
Visva-Bharati University alumni
Indian art educators
Indian arts administrators
Painters from Kerala
Indian male painters
20th-century Indian educators
Indian engravers
Indian lithographers
Recipients of Kalidas Samman